The Peptidoglycolipid Addressing Protein (GAP) Family is a member of the Lysine Exporter (LysE) Superfamily. It is listed as item 2.A.116 in the Transporter Classification Database. The mechanism of its action is not known, but this family has been shown to be a member of the LsyE superfamily. Therefore, these proteins are most likely secondary carriers.

The proposed generalized reaction catalyzed by members of the GAP family is:

PGL (in) → PGL (outer membrane).

See also 
 Transport Protein
 Glycolipid

References

Further reading 
 Tsu, Brian V.; Saier, Milton H. "The LysE Superfamily of Transport Proteins Involved in Cell Physiology and Pathogenesis". PLOS ONE 10 (10).doi:10.1371/journal.pone.0137184. PMC 4608589.PMID 26474485.
 Seeliger, Jessica C.; Holsclaw, Cynthia M.; Schelle, Michael W.; Botyanszki, Zsofia; Gilmore, Sarah A.; Tully, Sarah E.; Niederweis, Michael; Cravatt, Benjamin F.; Leary, Julie A. (2012-03-09). "Elucidation and Chemical Modulation of Sulfolipid-1 Biosynthesis in Mycobacterium tuberculosis". Journal of Biological Chemistry 287 (11): 7990–8000. doi:10.1074/jbc.M111.315473. ISSN 0021-9258. PMC 3318749. PMID 22194604.

Protein families
Membrane proteins
Transmembrane proteins
Transmembrane transporters
Transport proteins
Integral membrane proteins